Nita Cavalier (May 15, 1906 – April 4, 1969) was an American silent film and stage actress.

Early life
Nita Cavalier was born on May 15, 1906, in Denver, Colorado. She moved to Los Angeles, California with her family at the age of one. She attended the Hollywood High School.

Career
Cavalier was a stage actress. In 1928, she performed in Kongo at the Granada Theater in Ontario, California alongside Howard Sinclair. In 1930, she performed in The Bachelor Father at the Garrick Theatre alongside George LaMar.

She acted in silent films such as The Twin Triggers and The Stolen Ranch in 1926, followed by Tearin' Into Trouble and The Prince of Headwaiters in 1927.

She was also a polo player.

Death
She died on April 4, 1969, in San Diego, California.

Partial filmography
 A Thief in Paradise (1925)
 The Coast of Folly (1925)
 The Twin Triggers (1926)
 The Dead Line (1926)
 The Stolen Ranch (1926)
 Tearin' Into Trouble (1927)
 The Prince of Headwaiters (1927)

References

External links

British Film Institute: Nita Cavalier

1906 births
1969 deaths
People from Denver
People from Los Angeles
20th-century American actresses
American polo players
20th-century American women